Bimalendu Bikash Roy Chowdhury was a Bangladeshi judge and former adviser of the Caretaker government of Bangladesh.

Early life
Chowdhury was born on 1 November 1935 in Bakila, Hajiganj, Chandpur, East Bengal, British Raj.

Career
In 1962 Chowdhury started his career as a lawyer in the Dhaka High Court. He was made an additional judge in 1985 of the High Court. He was promoted to the appellate division of the Supreme Court. He retired in 2000.

Death
Chowdhury died on 11 April 2005 in a hospital in Kolkata. The Justice Bimalendu Bikash Roy Chowdhury National Memory Celebration Council was formed to honor his memory.

References

2005 deaths
Advisors of Caretaker Government of Bangladesh
Bangladeshi judges
Bangladeshi Hindus
People from Chandpur District